Albert Cornelius Besselink (June 10, 1923 – April 10, 2017) was an American professional golfer who played on the PGA Tour in the 1950s and 1960s.

Besselink grew up in Merchantville, New Jersey. He attended the University of Miami and was the first UM golfer to win a national tournament. He won the Southern Intercollegiate Championship twice before graduating in 1949. He turned pro later that year.

Besselink won five PGA Tour events including the inaugural Tournament of Champions in 1953. The field was made up of 20 professionals, all tournament winners in the prior twelve months. With a six-foot par putt on the 18th hole, he finished with a 280, beating Chandler Harper by one stroke. Besselink was paid off with a wheelbarrow filled with silver dollars. He also had bet $500 on himself at 25 to 1, earning another $12,500. Because he had just heard that Babe Zaharias had been diagnosed with cancer he donated half of his $10,000 first prize to the Damon Runyon Cancer Fund. Besselink and Zaharias had won the International Two-Ball Championship at Orlando in February 1952.

Besselink was called "Bessie" by the other tour players and was known for living life with a gambler's recklessness and a showman's flair. One famous example of his showmanship occurred during the third round of the 1965 Colonial National Invitation in Fort Worth when Besselink played the final four holes of his third round with a red rose—plucked from a bush at the 15th hole—between his teeth. Afterward, Besselink said the gesture was a nod to the "loveliness of Texas women in general and Fort Worth women in particular." The next day, locker room attendants presented Besselink with 50 roses sent by female fans.

In 2016, it was reported that Besselink, then aged 93, was living in a one-storey care home in South Florida. He was by then using a wheelchair and suffering from severe memory loss. Besselink died in Florida on April 10, 2017, at the age of 93.

Amateur wins
1948 Southern Intercollegiate Championship
1949 Southern Intercollegiate Championship

Professional wins (18)

PGA Tour wins (5)

PGA Tour playoff record (1–1)

Other wins (13)
1946 Azalea Open (as an amateur)
1952 International Mixed Two-Ball Open (with Babe Zaharias), Colombian Open, Barranquilla Open (Colombia)
1955 West Palm Beach Open
1956 Havana Invitational
1960 Philadelphia PGA Championship
1961 Pennsylvania Open Championship
1963 Philadelphia Open Championship
1965 Caracas Open (Feb), Caracas Open (Nov)
1966 Philadelphia Open Championship
1969 Philadelphia PGA Championship

Results in major championships

Note: Besselink never played in The Open Championship.

WD = withdrew
R64, R32, R16, QF, SF = round in which player lost in PGA Championship match play
"T" indicates a tie for a place

Summary

Most consecutive cuts made – 4 (1950 U.S. Open – 1952 Masters)
Longest streak of top-10s – 1 (four times)

References

External links

American male golfers
PGA Tour golfers
PGA Tour Champions golfers
Miami Hurricanes men's golfers
Golfers from New Jersey
Sportspeople from Camden County, New Jersey
People from Merchantville, New Jersey
1923 births
2017 deaths